San Antonito Church and Cemetery is a historic Catholic church building and cemetery built in 1886 in San Antonito, New Mexico. It was added to the multiple properties listing of religious properties for the National Register of Historic Places on January 6, 1997.

See also 

 National Register of Historic Places listings in Bernalillo County, New Mexico

References

Churches on the National Register of Historic Places in New Mexico
Churches completed in 1886
Churches in Bernalillo County, New Mexico
National Register of Historic Places in Bernalillo County, New Mexico
Cemeteries on the National Register of Historic Places in New Mexico